La casa is a 1954 novel by Argentine writer Manuel Mujica Laínez.

La Casa may also refer to:
"Casa de Mi Padre" (song), a Spanish song by American singer Christina Aguilera
La Casa (film series), a series of Italian horror films